Clone Wars Adventures was an online virtual world based on the animated television series Star Wars: The Clone Wars. Players could create and customize in-world avatars and participate in a variety of Clone Wars-themed mini-games and activities, earning Republic credits to purchase new weapons, outfits, ships, and furniture. Clone Wars Adventures was free to download and play, but only those that had a paid membership got access to a majority of the game's features. Additionally, many outfits and premium items could only be purchased with Station Cash, a form of in game currency that players needed to purchase with real money instead of in-game credits. This MMO game follows a similar business model to Free Realms. However, unlike Free Realms, the game was released at retail, though the game is free-to-play.

Clone Wars Adventures reached one of its milestones after 10 million players registered for the game. The first ten million players who joined were given a free Golden Death Watch set and a huge presentation of game statistics from SOE since the game's launch. On January 24, 2014, Sony Online Entertainment announced that the game would be shut down on March 31, 2014.

Setting
The in-game world of Clone Wars Adventures was set in the Jedi Temple on Coruscant set between Episodes II and III of Star Wars. Here players can interact with popular Clone Wars characters like Anakin Skywalker, Mace Windu, Yoda, and Obi-Wan Kenobi, and play more than 20 different mini-games including Lightsaber Duel, Republic Defender, a tower defense game, and Speeder Bike Racing. Other mini-games are campaign based on Seasons 3, 4, and 5 from Star Wars the Clone Wars. Players can challenge each other in multi-player games to win Credits. Even though the game is based on the Jedi temple, players can travel to different planets like Ryloth, Umbara, and Carlac when going to the hangar bay. Players can also interact with other players using the world chat, which allows communication and chatting to a certain distance, or private chat, allowing players to run a conversation with only one other person. Players are also given a buddy list, to add and chat with friends, and an ignore list, to block all communications and requests from that particular player. Additionally, Members can even create player guilds (squads) to allow maximum interaction with friends and access to a private chat room. All players are given options to play games, build on their own lots, participate in events, and much more. The environment of the game is constantly changing, with weekly updates adding content to the game for players to experience for themselves.

Gameplay
Clone Wars Adventures offered a huge selection of mini-games including strategy, action, puzzle, racing, and combat games. Mini-games were initially any player's main source of income - Republic Credits. However mini-games also offered challenges and goals for players. There were 30+ mini-games  for players to play. Non-members were given partial access to a minority of the games, while paying Members were rewarded with total access and the full experience to each mission. Most mini-games had their own trophies that came along with completing a challenging feat in that certain mini-game. Select mini-games had their own title that were associated with it like Jedi General for Republic Defender or Jedi Ace for Starfighter. Another game is Lightsaber Duel. Titles for that included: Blademaster, Duelist, and Sentinel.

Players could engage in battles with droids, Umbarans, Death Watch troopers, and infamous characters like Darth Maul in combat zones. The game offered two combat zones, Umbara and Carlac which contained active quests, missions. Players could explore these worlds by foot or vehicle, and face dangerous enemies. Typically, all AI enemies dropped two Republic Credits that players could use to purchase a wide variety of items, and leftover scrap items. Using the player combat system, a diverse system of fighting for both AIs and players alike, both members and non-members could unleash powerful attacks upon their opponents who usually dropped a special piece of material used to craft various items or complete collections. Players were given access to abilities that depended on the current weapon the player was using, power-ups with companions, and field equipment to aid them in combat.

Players could purchase droid companions like R2-D2 or TO-DO to follow them around in game. There were also special attachments that allow pets to do new things, like a boombox to make other players dance, or mounted guns to fire lasers when clicked on. Players could also unlock more droids like C-3PO by entering special game codes on the Clone Wars Adventures website home page. Other companions included adopted creatures such as a Jawa. There were several Creature Pets available such as the Convor, a bird-like creature, with helmet attachments available for purchase. Other creatures included an Anooba, Kowakian monkey-lizard, a brown rancor, and a red rancor, which could only be obtained by receiving the pet in a special crate and purchasing an SC Code to open it. In addition to the entertainment of owning a companion, players were also given special abilities associated with their current pet. These power-ups provided boosts like speed and extra-damage while both on and off the battlefield.

Battle Classes were introduced to players on the update of September 28, 2012. The system allows a more achievable set of goals and rewards upon defeating enemies in combat zones. Players are given four primary battle classes, Jedi, Trooper, Sith, and Mercenary to rank up in and obtain exclusive rewards. The Trooper class is set as a default for all players and is free, while sinister classes, Sith and Mercenary require a Station Cash purchase of 750 SC to experience. Unlike the other battle classes, Jedi is only accessible through a paid membership without any additional purchase. Additionally, paying members are given a 50% discount on both the Sith and Mercenary classes alike. All battle classes require experience points to allow players to rank up in. Experience points are dropped by defeated enemies in combat zones and mini-games. Ranks gradually become more difficult as the player progresses through that particular class. Along with ranking up, players are given a while new set of titles corresponding to rank, and several pieces of wearable gear. Specialty Classes, alongside battle classes, differ in several ways including the fact that they do not require combat zones to progress in. Specialty classes are passive player classes used within certain mini-games and are ranked up via certain activities. For example, the Scoundrel class incorporates Card Assault, a card based mini-game, with this specialty class. Upon the completion of campaign missions, the player rises through the ranks and is rewarded a special deck of cards.

Economy and social
Clone Wars Adventures used two forms of currency: Standard "Republic Credits" and "Station Cash". Republic Credits allowed players to purchase items or companions throughout the game. These were obtained through various activities ingame, whereas "Station Cash" was a premium currency that could be obtained through microtransactions, allowing players to purchase access to otherwise exclusive in-game items and challenges. It was free to download and play, but free players will have restricted access to mini-games, equipment, furniture, and game areas. For a monthly subscription fee, members have full access to game content, excluding any premium items that must be purchased separately with station cash such as original costumes or exclusive actions and housing items. Members are given access to VIP areas, more Mini-Games, the ability to wield dual-lightsabers, member-only items, the exclusive Jedi battle class, and a special deluxe house. Members are also allowed access to more mini-games, furniture, and extra game content.

All events current to date will be displayed in the Event Calendar. The Event Calendar can be accessed via the "Play Games" button. Official SOE employees can be observed many times hosting events in Clone Wars Adventures in which all players are welcome to attend. Such events are referred to as "Emissary Events" in reference to its host, Emissary Event, the lead emissary represented as a player but with a pink colored player name. Events include Speeder Bike Racing, Lightsaber Dueling, House Inspections, Trivia Events, and many more. Players have the chance to even obtain prizes from participating in these events including DO-T, a blue protocol droid. Players are always welcome to attend Emissary Events, as present in the Event Calendar. Apart from Emissary Events, Daily Tournaments challenge players to a specific mission is mini-games, Attack Cruiser, Republic Defender, and Starfighter. Upon reaching a high score, players are measured in the top 100 list according to the time they played and the score they received. All players within the top 100 leaderboards will receive a special bundle of prizes and Credits.

All players are given their own personal house in game. Free players are provided a Felucian Starter Lot, while members are given the larger and more customizable Jedi Living Quarters in addition to the lot. Originally, players were given a free Padawan Dormitory. Add on rooms like the Droid Destruction Chamber or the Hidden Armory can be purchased with Station Cash. Additional player houses can be purchased with Station Cash as well, like the Attack Cruiser house that gives the player access to their own Republic battleship, and a Mustafar Lot which allows players to customize their house on a volcano surrounded by rivers of lava. Each of these houses has its own set of furniture appropriate for its environment such as Cruiser sets and Mustafar furniture. A huge selection of lots are available at the In-Game Store for Station Cash, while others are only obtainable through specific activities or mini-games, like the Tatooine lot.

Players can customize their houses with furniture and other decorations. Non-Members are allowed one set of housing items based on lower city furniture, while Jedi members are given access to purchase over 30 different sets of furniture including regular furniture, turrets, and building materials using game Credits or Station Cash. Players are still allowed access to these even when their membership ends, but only if they still have them in their furniture storage. Station Cash furniture sets include Gungan furniture, Mon Calamari aquatic furniture, and alien guests. Some items can even perform actions when clicked upon like disco balls and turrets. Sony allows players to buy promotional items like tree lights, face masks, and sparklers on special Holidays such as Valentine's Day, and Christmas (known in Star Wars as "Life Day"). Players can invite their friends over to their houses for parties, gatherings, etc. A house rating system allows players to give the player's house a rating from 1-5 stars. Players can submit their houses for rating and even name their own lots, but are not permitted to edit the house until it is removed from the housing directory.

Clone Wars offers Jedi Members to create player guilds (squads) as a way to chat with a large group of people, set up an organization, or just to get to know other players. Special squads including ones that are created by Emissaries or CWA Counselors are strictly off-limits to any player. Players can also create squads that focus only of specific people groups like Clone Troopers, Jedi, Sith, Bounty Hunters, etc. When creating a squad, the player will be required to name the squad and submit it for approval by a Moderator. A notice will be sent to the squad create when their squad has been created so they may begin to recruit players. All squads have a limit of 100 members and are each given their own private chat that is only visible to squad members. Upon recruiting players to the squad, the leader or leaders have the option to promote members. Only Jedi Members can be promoted; Padawans cannot. The player is given the choice on how high to promote the member. They are also given the ability to demote any member.

Development
Clone Wars Adventures was developed and published by Sony Online Entertainment, the developers of well received massively multiplayer online role playing video game, Free Realms. It was announced at E3 2010, and is based on the animated television series Star Wars: The Clone Wars. When Clone Wars Adventures original concept was created it was planned to be Star Wars's third MMO and would provide a way aside of the television series to spark interest in Star Wars the Clone Wars. During the pre-development stages of the game licensing was worked out with Lucasfilm in order for SOE to attain rights for the game. The contract extended SOE exclusive rights to have access to all of the sound used in the series as well as access to the series's artwork (though it may have had to be re-modeled in order to be compatible with the game's engine, ForgeLight), inclusion of the games story-line as Star Wars canon, and access to all the episodes time in advance.

In order to be more engaging to the series viewers, the designers spent countless time creating the game to fit in well with the storyline. This led the designers to create games that were inline with the show such as Lightsaber Dueling, and Starfighter. Also many of the levels brought up in the mini-games extended many of the episodes, and even introduced brand-new storylines, to fit in with the series. Another large effort on the game's creation was to create an art-style that gave the look and the feel of Star Wars: The Clone Wars. Also parts of the game were created for marketing material, such as SOE's collaboration on the original Ryloth campaign for the game and the gungan lightsaber, which promoted Hasbro's Join the Jedi marketing campaign. SOE even had two of their flash mini-games featured on Starwars.com, one of the two not being the original mini-game but using a base template from the game "Rocket Rescue". The game was based on SOE's internal ForgeLight game engine, and was coded in c++ like all other SOE games. The game's artificial intelligence was created and developed in Autodesk Kyanpse. Much of the game also used many of RAD Game Tools products including Granny 3-D, Bink Video, and the Miles Sound System. Autodesk's Scaleform was also used for the games Graphical User Interface (GUI). Also the games Speeder Bike Racing, and Attack Cruiser were developed by Big Bang Entertainment LLC a third-party company who had also developed some mini-games for Free Realms. Lucasfilm themselves also helped with the audio production, publishing, and the management of the game.

Clone Wars Adventures is given an ESRB rating of Everyone 10+ for crude humor and fantasy violence. The game has also been given an ESRB Kid's Privacy Certification to further ensure the safety for children playing Clone Wars Adventures. The game was designed with young fans of the television show in mind. In an effort to support online safety for children, strict filters only allow pre-approved words to be shown in chat, restricting the ability of a player to communicate personal information to others in game or to use bad language. The chat filter also blocks out numbers or numerals to prevent the use of further personal information or private codes.

Reception
Clone Wars Adventures received mixed reviews from critics. Metacritic gave the game an aggregate score of 65, based on 4 reviews. GameZebo gave it a score of 3.5/5, stating that it contained "Incredible variety of mini-games", and praised its presentation, commenting that it "...matches the look and feel of Clone Wars series perfectly". They further criticized it because "Too much content is locked away." Avault awarded Clone Wars Adventures 4 out of 5 stars, emphasizing that "It doesn't matter whether you're a Star Wars fan or not. This free-to-play browser based game is worth a look..."

References

External links
 
 Official Press Release

2010 video games
Massively multiplayer online role-playing games
Products and services discontinued in 2014
Free-to-play video games
Inactive massively multiplayer online games
Digital collectible card games
MacOS games
Republic Heroes
Video games developed in the United States
Windows games